Upper Lachlan Shire is a local government area in the Southern Tablelands region of New South Wales, Australia. The Shire was formed in February 2004 from Crookwell Shire and parts of Mulwaree, Gunning and Yass Shires.

The mayor of Upper Lachlan Shire Council is Cr. Pam Kensit, an unaligned politician.

Towns and localities
The shire includes the towns and bigger localities of:

and the smaller localities of:

Heritage listings
The Gundungurra people are the traditional owners of most of the Upper Lachlan Shire. 

The Upper Lachlan Shire also has a number of European heritage-listed sites, including:
 Collector, 24 Church Street (Federal Highway): Bushranger Hotel
 Crookwell, Goulburn-Crookwell railway: Crookwell railway station
 Gunning, Main Southern railway: Gunning railway station
 Taralga, Macarthur Street: Catholic Church of Christ the King

Council

Current composition and election method
Upper Lachlan Shire Council is composed of nine councillors elected proportionally as one entire ward. All Councillors are elected for a fixed four-year term of office. The mayor is elected by the councillors at the first meeting of the council. The most recent election was held on 10 September 2016, and the makeup of the council is as follows:

The current Council, elected in 2016, in order of election, is:

References

External links 
 Upper Lachlan Shire Council

 
Local government areas of New South Wales